Hunt: Showdown is a  first-person shooter video game developed and published by Crytek. It was launched on Steam in early access on 22 February 2018, and for Xbox Game Preview on 29 May 2019. The full release of the game launched on 27 August 2019 for Microsoft Windows, it was also released on Xbox One on 19 September 2019 and PlayStation 4 on 18 February 2020. In the game, the player assumes the role of a bounty hunter who must kill a mythical monster in order to claim the bounty and survive long enough to reach an extraction point.

Hunt: Showdown was originally in development at Crytek USA, who wished to create a spiritual successor to Darksiders—a video game series developed by their predecessor, Vigil Games—under the title Hunt: Horrors of the Gilded Age. It was envisioned to be a cooperative multiplayer game. After the initial announcement in June 2014, Crytek USA was shut down due to financial issues, and the development was brought to the Crytek headquarters in Germany. The game, under the new title Hunt: Showdown, was re-announced in May 2017 and became a competitive multiplayer game in which players need to combat other players and enemies controlled by artificial intelligence in a large map that resembles an open world. The game received generally positive reviews upon release and was praised for its innovative gameplay loop.

Gameplay

Hunt: Showdown is a multiplayer first-person shooter with two gameplay modes. In "Bounty Hunt", the player plays as a bounty hunter who hunts down one or two of the game's 4 bosses to claim a bounty. Players can work on their own or with up to two other players to find clues about the monster's location in the three maps. Each map functions as a medium-sized open world filled with other environmental dangers and enemies such as Grunts, Hives, or Armoreds. As the player collects more clues, the location of the monster's lair is narrowed down. There are four monsters, including the Butcher, the Spider, the Assassin, and the new boss, the Scrapbeak. Players can use a variety of weapons ranging from shotguns to crossbows to defeat their enemies, though the amount of ammo is scarce in this game, forcing players to rely on making their shots count. They also have access to a large variety of tools such as traps and decoys. Upon killing the monster, players will collect the bounty and need to survive until they can reach one of the extraction points. The locations of these exits are randomly placed in a map. Collecting a bounty gives the player limited ability to see the approximate location of other nearby players, but also reveals the bounty-holder's location to all other players in the in-game map. Players can steal a bounty by killing a current bounty-holder, which is a core strategic component of the game. Each match supports up to 12 players.

The game's second mode, "Quickplay", is a battle royale mode that lasts for 15 minutes. In each match, the player is tasked to find an energy wellspring in a map and fend off hostile attacks.

Development 
Vigil Games, known for the Darksiders series, was shut down by THQ in 2013 as part of the publisher's bankruptcy. While Crytek's founder Cevat Yerli had expressed an interest in bidding for the Austin-based studio based on their work on Darksiders alone (and because Crytek was already planning to establish a US subsidiary in the city), he did not feel that their products fit with the company's business strategy. However, immediately after Vigil was closed, Yerli brought Vigil head David Adams on board to lead the new studio, Crytek USA, citing Adams' leadership skills. In turn, Crytek USA would hire many former employees from Vigil. It was originally stated that the new studio would focus on developing new projects rather than pursue regaining the rights to its former properties; the studio did attempt to re-gain the rights to Darksiders — but they were instead acquired by Nordic Games.

Hunt: Horrors of the Gilded Age was announced in June 2014 as Crytek USA's first game. Hunt was designed to be a co-operative game; Adams recalled having been frequently asked about the possibility of adding co-op to a future installment of Darksiders, and stated that "one of the first things we said when we got here was, we are absolutely doing a four-player co-op game. That wasn't even up for discussion." The game is set in the late-19th century, and features weapons and classes reminiscent of the era. In response to comparisons to The Order: 1886, another 19th-century third-person gothic action horror game that was unveiled at E3, Adams contended that there were few similarities between the games, noting their focus on co-op and arguing that the portrayal of the era in The Hunt was more "authentic", unlike that of The Order, which he felt was the "BioShock version" of the era. Players will be able to customise their characters with different skills and outfits; Adams said that "if you want to make Sherlock Holmes or a gunslinger from the Old West, or a witch hunter from Eastern Europe, you have the costume choices, you have the weapon choices, you have the skill choices."

Hunt: Showdown carries "a lot of the DNA" of the Darksiders series; Adams noted that the game would incorporate "old school elements" of its genre in new ways (much like Darksiders, which cited The Legend of Zelda as an influence), and feature a large number of distinct creatures and bosses as enemies in contrast to "typical" shooting games, which, in Adam's opinion, only tended to have "maybe a dozen" different enemies. He acknowledged that his staff had experience from Darksiders in designing large numbers of distinct enemy types—Adams alone designed 18 of the bosses in Darksiders II. Hunt also utilizes procedurally generated enemy placement, obstacles, and objectives on the map, so that no two missions are identical. Hunt is built atop CryEngine; Adams remarked that the transition from the custom engine developed for Darksiders to CryEngine made the former look inferior.

On 30 July 2014, Crytek announced that as part of a restructuring, development of Hunt would be shifted to Crytek, and Crytek USA would cease to operate as a studio-only as a provider of US-based support for CryEngine licensees. Kotaku reported that much of the studio's staff, including David Adams, had left the company in response to late wage payments by Crytek. Similar issues had been experienced by Crytek UK, which was shut down the same day with the sale of the Homefront franchise to Koch Media.

On 16 May 2017, Crytek released a teaser on YouTube announcing that the game was still in production under a new title, Hunt: Showdown. In October, Crytek revealed via IGN First that the game would have an Early Access release on Steam. A closed alpha test on PC started in January 2018. The closed alpha concluded on 22 February, with the early access launching later the same day. Hunt was released for Xbox Game Preview on 29 May 2019.

Release 
Hunt: Horrors of the Gilded Age was first announced to have a beta in late 2014, after which a planned released for PlayStation 4 and Xbox One. Hunt was initially planned to be a free-to-play game, however, Adams emphasised that the game would still have the quality and size of a "AAA" title. Hunt was to be monetised purely through cosmetic items and experience boosts, however, when the game launched in Early Access on 22 February 2018, it was released with a buy-to-play model.

On 13 December 2014, Crytek delayed the late 2014 planned closed beta without giving a date or range for when it may come. The delay was due to the transition of development from their Austin studio to their Frankfurt team.

Hunt: Showdown was launched in early access on 22 February 2018. It was announced at 2018 Gamescom that the game would be released on Xbox One through its Xbox Game Preview program.

On 3 July 2019, Crytek announced on the game's website that the official release of the game would be on 27 August 2019, for Microsoft Windows. The Xbox One official release was due to be released on the same day as the official release for Microsoft Windows, but was delayed to 19 September 2019 due to technical issues. The game was released on PlayStation 4 on 18 February 2020.

Television series
In November 2021, Binge announced a live-action television series adaptation of the game. Binge's Allan Ungar and Vince Talenti will produce, with Crytek's Avni Yerli, Faruk Yerli, and Pascal Tonecker joining as executive producers.

Reception

Critical reception
The game received generally positive reviews upon release according to review aggregator Metacritic. Critics praised the game for its innovative gameplay loop and noted that the game offered a very unique experience when compared with other multiplayer games on the market, though some critics were disappointed by the game's lack of content at launch.

VG247 praised the unpredictability of Hunt, writing that it " I know where enemies are likely to come from, and what they’re likely to do, and yet every game seems to throw something surprising up... because it simply provides such a broad canvas for imaginative gambits by players." Eurogamer liked the feeling of dread that Hunt created, saying that,  "I'm not sure I've played a multiplayer game that breeds such tension since Rainbow Six: Siege."  PCGamesN's Benjamin Griffin felt that sound design helped the gameplay be more tense "Flocks of crows, creaking boardwalks, and maimed horses wailing on the ground all signal your presence, while inside, jangling chains and crunching glass are to be avoided." Anthony McGlynn of PC Gamer enjoyed Hunt's twist on the battle royale genre, feeling that the game's focus "about escaping, not killing everyone—is simple but deeply effective". However he criticized the limited number of maps and weapons as making the game feel repetitive past a certain point.

Accolades 
The game was nominated for "Best Sound Design for an Indie Game" at the 18th Annual G.A.N.G. Awards.

References

External links 
 

2019 video games
Cooperative video games
CryEngine games
Crytek games
Horror video games
Open-world video games
PlayStation 4 games
Survival video games
Video games developed in Germany
Video games developed in the United States
Video games set in the 19th century
Video games with cross-platform play
Windows games
Xbox One games